

Draw

2016 South Asian Games